The 2020 Meus Prêmios Nick Awards were held on September 27, 2020, in São Paulo, Brazil. Due to the ongoing coronavirus pandemic, the event did not have an audience and was broadcast live on television and on Nickelodeon's social media networks simultaneously.

Winners and nominees 
Nominees were revealed on July 22, 2020. Singer and actress Manu Gavassi is the most-nominated with six nominations to her name. Maísa Silva is the second most-nominated with 5, and Larissa Manoela and Any Gabrielly each have 4. On August 13, the finalists were announced, in addition to having opened the voting for the 2nd phase with 3 new categories and Manu Gavassi is still the most nominated with now 5 categories.

References

External links
Official website

Nickelodeon Kids' Choice Awards
Brazilian awards
2020 music awards